The 2008 congressional elections in Michigan were held on November 4, 2008, to determine who would represent the state of Michigan in the United States House of Representatives. Michigan had fifteen seats in the House, apportioned according to the 2000 United States Census. Representatives are elected for two-year terms; those elected will serve in the 111th Congress from January 3, 2009, until January 3, 2011. The election coincided with the 2008 U.S. presidential election.

The 7th and 9th district seats were considered to be competitive. Both seats were occupied by Republicans who lost to Democratic opponents.

The makeup of the Michigan congressional delegation in 2008 consisted of nine Republicans and six Democrats.  As a result of the 2008 election, the delegation in 2009/2010 consists of eight Democrats and seven Republicans.  The two Democratic Party gains came in the 7th and 9th districts.

Overview

District 1

Popular incumbent Bart Stupak was unopposed in the Democratic primary. Conservative state Representative Tom Casperson, from Escanaba, won the Republican primary election over Linda Goldthorpe and Don Hooper. The Libertarian Party nominated  Daniel Grow; the U.S. Taxpayers Party nominated Joshua Warren and the Green Party nominated Socialist Jean Treacy.  The 1st District is generally socially conservative and strongly pro-union.  It covers the entire Upper Peninsula and the northern part of the Lower Peninsula, and is the largest congressional district east of the Mississippi River.  CQ Politics rating: Safe Democrat.

District 2

Pete Hoekstra, a conservative incumbent and ranking Republican on the House Intelligence Committee, was challenged by Democrat Fred Johnson, Libertarian Dan Johnson (campaign website) and U.S. Taxpayers Party candidate Ronald Graeser. The district is centered on Michigan's West Shoreline and includes the cities of Muskegon and Holland.  CQ Politics rating: Safe Republican.

District 3

Incumbent Vern Ehlers was re-elected.  The district trends Republican and is centered on Grand Rapids.  Ehlers was challenged by Democrat Henry Sanchez and Libertarian Erwin Haas. CQ Politics rating: Safe Republican.

District 4

Republican David Lee Camp was reelected.  He was by challenged by Democrat Andrew Concannon, Libertarian Allitta Hren, and U.S. Taxpayer Party candidate John Emerick. This large district stretches from Owosso in the east central part of the state to Traverse City to the extreme northwest part of the Lower Peninsula. CQ Politics rating: Safe Republican.

District 5

Democrat Dale Kildee ran for re-election in 2008.  The Flint area congressman has served for over 30 years.  His district (covering Flint, Saginaw, Bay City and part of the western part of The Thumb) is strongly Democratic.  Petitions were circulated for Democratic state senator John Gleason to challenge Kildee, but Gleason decided not to run. Kildee is challenged on by Republican candidate by Matt Sawicki of Bay City, Libertarian candidate Leonard Schwartz and Green Party candidate Ken Mathenia of Grand Blanc. CQ Politics rating: Safe Democrat.

District 6

Republican Fred Upton had three opponents, Democrat Don Cooney, Green Edward Pinkney and Libertarian Greg Merle. The sixth district covers the southwest corner of lower Michigan. CQ Politics rating: Safe Republican.

District 7

The seventh district covers the middle part of southern lower Michigan. Republican incumbent Tim Walberg faced State Senate Minority Leader and Democratic nominee Mark Schauer, Libertarian Ken Proctor, Green Lynn Meadows and independent Sharon Reiner. CQ Politics forecast the race as 'No Clear Favorite'.

Walberg was elected in 2006 with a surprisingly thin 49.9% of the vote, despite outspending Democratic opponent Sharon Reiner 20:1. This made Walberg a top target for defeat in 2008 by the Democratic Congressional Campaign Committee. Schauer defeated Renier in the August 5 primary, after which Renier ran in the general election as a write-in candidate with no party affiliation.

District 8

Incumbent Republican Mike Rogers was re-elected in 2006 with 55.3% of the vote compared to 42.9% for his Democratic opponent. East Lansing Democratic activist Bob Alexander  (who lost in 2004 to Rogers) announced that he is running again.  Aaron Stuttman is running for the Green Party, Will Tyler White for the Libertarian Party. and George Zimmer for the U.S. Taxpayer Party. This district stretches from the western Detroit suburbs to the Lansing area. CQ Politics rating: Safe Republican.

District 9

This district covers parts of Oakland County. Republican incumbent Joe Knollenberg was challenged by former Michigan Lottery commissioner and military veteran, Democratic nominee Gary Peters. Libertarian Adam Goodman, Green Party Douglas Campbell and Independent Dr. Jack Kevorkian were also running. CQ Politics forecasted the race as 'No Clear Favorite'.

Knollenberg was targeted by the Democratic Congressional Campaign Committee after his surprisingly narrow margin of victory in the 2006 election, receiving 51.5% of the vote compared with 46.2% for his Democratic opponent.

District 10

Republican incumbent Candice Miller was challenged by Democratic nominee Robert Denison, Libertarian Neil Kiernan Stephenson, and Green Candace Caveny. This district stretches from the northeast Detroit suburbs up to most of The Thumb. CQ Politics rating: Safe Republican.

District 11

Incumbent Republican Thad McCotter was challenged by Democrat Joseph Larkin who defeated Edward Kriewall in the August 5 party primary. Also running were Libertarian John Tatar and Green Erik Shelley. This district covers part of Detroit's western suburbs. CQ Politics rating: Lean Republican.

District 12

12-term Democrat Sander M. Levin was challenged by Republican Bert Copple, Libertarian John Vico, Green William J. O'Palicky and U.S. Taxpayers' Lester Townsend.  This district covers part of Detroit's northern suburbs. CQ Politics rating: Safe Democrat.

District 13

Incumbent Democrat Carolyn Cheeks Kilpatrick narrowly survived the August 5 party primary.  She faced complications due to the legal troubles facing her son Detroit mayor Kwame Kilpatrick. Cheeks Kilpatrick won with 39.1% of the vote over former state representative Mary Waters with 36% of the vote and state senator Martha Scott with 24.9% of the vote.  A televised debate between the three candidates developed into a shouting match. Cheeks Kilpatrick faced Republican candidate Edward Gubics, Libertarian candidate Greg Creswell and Green Party candidate George Cosetti in the general election.  This district covers the east side of Detroit and its eastern and Downriver suburbs.  CQ Politics rating: Safe Democrat.

District 14

Powerful incumbent Democrat John Conyers, chairman of the House Judiciary Committee, had one Democratic opponent in the primary, Detroit pastor Rev. Horace Sheffield, but Sheffield's campaign was short lived because he withdrew his name and announced his support for Conyers. Conyers faced Libertarian Rick Secula and Green Party Clyde Shabazz in the general election. This district covers the west side of Detroit and some inner western and downriver suburbs. CQ Politics rating: Safe Democrat.

District 15

55-year Congressional veteran Democrat John Dingell is the Dean of the House and chairman of the House Energy and Commerce Committee.  He was challenged by Republican Jack Lynch, Libertarian Gregory Scott Stempfle, Green Aimee Smith and U.S. Taxpayers Party candidate James Wagner. The 15th district includes Ann Arbor, Ypsilanti, Monroe, the downriver suburbs of Detroit and the semi-rural southeastern corner of Michigan. CQ Politics rating: Safe Democrat.

References

External links
 Elections in Michigan from the Michigan Secretary of State
 U.S. Congress candidates for Michigan at Project Vote Smart
 Michigan U.S. House Races from 2008 Race Tracker
 Campaign contributions for Michigan congressional races from OpenSecrets

2008
Michigan
United States House of Representatives